Nevskia aquatilis is an aerobic, rod-shaped and non-motile bacterium from the genus of Nevskia which has been isolated from water from an aquifer in Portugal.

References

Bacteria described in 2013
Xanthomonadales